Sardu may refer to:

Sardinian language, language of the island of Sardinia
Someone from the island of Sardinia
Icer Addis, programmer
Şardu, a village in Sânpaul Commune, Cluj County, Romania
Șardu, a tributary of the Valea Mare in Cluj County,  Romania
SARDU Multiboot Builder, SARDU stands for Shardana Antivirus Rescue Disk Utility
Master Sardu, a character from the 1976 film Bloodsucking Freaks

See also